Cedarville High School may refer to:

 Cedarville High School (Arkansas), located in Cedarville, Arkansas
 Cedarville High School (Cedarville, Ohio)